Damian Zieliński (born 2 December 1981) is a Polish cyclist. He was born in Szczecin. He competed at the 2004 Summer Olympics in Athens, and at the 2012 Summer Olympics in London.

References

1981 births
Living people
Sportspeople from Szczecin
Polish male cyclists
Cyclists at the 2004 Summer Olympics
Cyclists at the 2012 Summer Olympics
Cyclists at the 2016 Summer Olympics
Olympic cyclists of Poland
Polish track cyclists